The red-and-black grosbeak (Periporphyrus erythromelas) is a species of bird in the family Cardinalidae, the cardinals or cardinal grosbeaks. 
It is found in Brazil, French Guiana, Guyana, Suriname, and Venezuela.

Taxonomy and systematics

The red-and-black grosbeak is the only member of genus Periporphyrus and has no subspecies. However, there is some evidence that this genus and Rhodothraupis should be merged into Caryothraustes.

Description

Both sexes have a heavy black bill and their entire head including the throat is black. The male's nape, breast, and belly are bright red and its back is a deep red. The female's upper parts are dark greenish yellow and the underparts yellowish green. The immature male has a similar color scheme to the adult but it is duller.

Distribution and habitat

The red-and-black grosbeak is primarily found from far eastern Venezuela east through the Guianas and into northern Brazil. It has also been observered in Brazil south of the Amazon River.

Behavior

Feeding

The red-and-black grosbeak forages in the lower levels of the forest for arthropods and seeds. It does not join mixed-species foraging flocks but feeds in pairs or family groups.

Breeding

No information has been published on the red-and-black grosbeak's breeding phenology.

Vocalization

Both sexes of red-and-black grosbeak sing "an exceptionally sweet series of halting phrases" . Its call is a "sharp 'spink'" .

Status

The IUCN has assessed the red-and-black grosbeak as being of Least Concern. Between 2012 and 2018 it had been considered Near Threatened.

References

External links
Stamps (for Suriname) with RangeMap

red-and-black grosbeak
Birds of the Guianas
Birds of the Amazon Basin
red-and-black grosbeak
red-and-black grosbeak
Birds of Brazil
Taxonomy articles created by Polbot
Taxobox binomials not recognized by IUCN